= Phra Udom Prachanat =

1. REDIRECT Luang Phor Phern Thitakuno
- From an alternative name: This is a redirect from a title that is another name or identity such as an alter ego, a nickname, or a synonym of the target, or of a name associated with the target.
  - This redirect leads to the title in accordance with the naming conventions for common names to aid searches and writing. It is not necessary to replace these redirected links with a piped link.
  - If this redirect is an incorrect name for the target, then {{R from incorrect name}} should be used instead.
